Hwang Sin (1560–1617) was an officer of the Joseon Dynasty Korea in 16th and 17th centuries. In 1588, Hwang placed first in the final civil service examination (Mungwa).

He was also Korean diplomat and ambassador, representing Joseon interests in a diplomatic mission to the court of Toyotomi Hideyoshi in Japan.

1596-1597 mission to Japan
In the 23rd year of the reign of King Seonjo, the Joseon Court directed that a diplomatic mission to Japan would be dispatched to Kyoto. The Joseon representatives travelled with the Ming ambassadors who traveled to Kyoto to meet with Hideyoshi. The chief envoy of this Joseon delegation was Hwang sin.

The purpose of this embassy was negotiating end of hostilities on the Korean peninsula and withdrawal of invading Japanese forces. Hwang also hoped to arrange for the repatriation of more than 5,000 prisoners.  However, the venture served only to arouse Hideyoshi's anger; and as a consequence, the Japanese forces were increased rather than reduced.  Although diplomacy was intended to help move Joseon and Japan towards more normal relations, the mission was not understood to signify that relations were "normalized."

See also
 Joseon diplomacy
 Joseon missions to Japan
 Joseon tongsinsa

Notes

References

 Kang, Etsuko Hae-jin. (1997). Diplomacy and Ideology in Japanese-Korean Relations: from the Fifteenth to the Eighteenth Century. Basingstoke, Hampshire; Macmillan. ; 
 Lee, Peter H., Koryŏ Taehakkyo and Minjok Munhwa Yŏnʼguso. (2000). The Record of the Black Dragon Year.  Seoul: Korea University Press. ; 
 Lewis, James Bryant. (2003). Frontier contact between chosŏn Korea and Tokugawa Japan. London: Routledge. 
 Palais, James B. (1995). Confucian Statecraft and Korean Institutions: Yu Hyŏngwŏn and the late Chosŏn Dynasty. Seattle: University of Washington Press.  ;

External links
 Joseon Tongsinsa Cultural Exchange Association ; 
 조선통신사연구 (Journal of Studies in Joseon Tongsinsa) 

1560 births
1617 deaths
16th-century Korean people
Korean diplomats